Massino may refer to:

 Massino Visconti, municipality in the Province of Novara, in the Italian region of Piedmont
 Joseph Massino, an American former mobster

See also 

 Massimo (disambiguation)